Ivan Tsachev (Bulgarian: Иван Цачев; born 18 January 1989) is a Bulgarian footballer who plays as a forward for Chernomorets Balchik.

Career

Youth career
As a young, Tsachev trained at Spartak Varna's youth academy.

Levski Sofia
Tsachev made his debut for the senior team during the second part of 2008–09 season. Soon after, on 26 April 2009, Tsachev scored his first goal for Levski Sofia's seniors against Belasitsa Petrich. The result of the match was 1:7 with a guest win for Levski.

On 17 May 2009, Tsachev scored his first hat-trick for the senior team, in the game against Spartak Varna after entering in 65th minute. The result of the match was a 5:0 home win for Levski. He became a Champion of Bulgaria in 2009.

Tsachev made his debut in Europe on 21 July 2009 in the second match of the 2nd Qualifying round of UEFA Champions League, where Levski beaten the team of UE Sant Julià 5:0. Tsachev scored the fourth goal in the 83rd minute.

Pirin Blagoevgrad
On 2 August 2009, Tsachev was loaned for one year to Pirin Blagoevgrad together with his teammate Stefan Stanchev. He made his debut against Litex Lovech, scoring in the process.

In the next round Pirin Blagoevgrad had a home game against Slavia Sofia. Tsachev started as a titular and scored again in the 47th minute to lead the "eagles" to a 1–0 victory.

Return to Levski Sofia
For the second part of 2009–10 season he returned to Levski Sofia. Tsachev made his official return on 20 March 2010 against Slavia Sofia. He entered the match as a substitute in 62nd minute. The result was 3–0 and Levski won the match.

Slavia Sofia
On 25 May 2010, it was officially announced that Tsachev had been bought by Slavia Sofia, where the new coach was Tsachev's former coach and the one who had given him his debut at Levski Sofia - Emil Velev.

Kaliakra
In 2011, Tsachev joined Kaliakra Kavarna. He scored his first league goal for the club on 18 April 2012, in a 7–1 away loss against Cherno More.

Botev Galabovo
On 3 July 2017, Tsachev signed with Botev Galabovo.

Nesebar
In June 2018, Tsachev returned to Nesebar.

Club career statistics
This statistic includes domestic league only

Last update: 20 June 2013

Honours

Club 
Levski Sofia
 A PFG (1): 2008–09

References

External links
 Tsachev at Levski's site
 Profile at LevskiSofia.info

1989 births
Living people
Sportspeople from Varna, Bulgaria
Bulgarian footballers
Bulgaria youth international footballers
Bulgaria under-21 international footballers
PFC Levski Sofia players
PFC Pirin Blagoevgrad players
PFC Slavia Sofia players
PFC Kaliakra Kavarna players
PFC Spartak Varna players
PFC Dobrudzha Dobrich players
FC Montana players
Neftochimic Burgas players
PFC Nesebar players
FC Botev Galabovo players
First Professional Football League (Bulgaria) players
Second Professional Football League (Bulgaria) players
Association football forwards